Ilya Vladimirovich Oskolkov-Tsentsiper (born 30 September 1967, Moscow, USSR), social designer, media manager and entrepreneur, inventor, charismatic pioneer. Founder of Afisha magazine, and president of the Strelka Institute for Media, Architecture and Design. He works and lives in Tel-Aviv.

In 1989 Oskolkov-Tsentsiper graduated in theatre history from the Lunacharsky State Institute for Theatre Arts Moscow (GITIS), today RATI, after which he completed a post-graduate course at the Cultural Politics Department, Université de Bourgogne, Dijon, France.

ART 
From 1989 to 1991, Ilya Oskolkov-Tsentsiper managed the sociological department at the Union of Artists of the USSR and worked as an art critic for Ogoniok magazine which achieved a record circulation of 4.6 million copies.

In 1990, together with a team of partners he set up ART-MIF (Moscow International Fair), the first international art fair in the Soviet Union, which ran for five years and held dozens of modern art exhibitions.

Media

Matador Magazine 
In 1993, Oskolkov-Tsentsiper was a leading member of the team that founded Matador Magazine, which popularized the new trend of Russian “intellectual glamour” featuring film, music, art, fashion and culture news.

Afisha 
In April 1999, Oskolkov-Tsentsiper teamed up with Andrew Paulson and Anton Kudryashov to found the highly influential Afisha magazine.  Afisha had a profound effect on Moscow's cultural and nightlife scene and broke new ground with its mix of informed commentary, listings and reviews.

Oskolkov-Tsentsiper brought together a team of young journalists, designers and photographers to create a unique Afisha style which had a major impact on Russian media. Many high-profile Russian artists made their first public appearances on Afisha's front cover and the magazine popularised several new fashion trends – even introducing numerous new words into the Russian lexicon, from “deadline” to “hipster”.

Afisha remains Russia's most popular lifestyle media brand with a monthly Internet audience of more than 4.5 million.

While at Afisha Oskolkov-Tsentsiper also launched and managed such publications as Afisha-Mir, a glossy monthly travel magazine, Bolshoy Gorod, a city magazine, Afisha-Yeda, a cookery magazine and a series of Afisha guidebooks on various cities and countries.

Moscow city projects

Afisha Picnic 
In 2004, Oskolkov-Tsentsiper launched Afisha Picnic, an annual open-air festival which has grown into Russia's largest music festival. Along with music, Afisha Picnic introduces its guests to modern art and street culture, and operates as a “hipster fashion” barometer. Such stars as Zemfira, Madness, Mujuice, Beirut, Petr Nalitch, Leningrad, Auktsyon, Mumiy Troll, Pompeya, Cops on Fire, Tesla Boy, Aquarium, Franz Ferdinand, Pet Shop Boys, Zhanna Aguzarova, Spleen and Blur appeared on the festival's stage over different years.

Strelka Institute
In 2009, Ilya Oskolkov-Tsentsiper founded the Strelka Institute for Media, Architecture and Design. The institute is located on the premises of the former Krasny Oktyabr factory in city's center.

Strelka is a non-profit postgraduate education institution. About 40 students from different countries study at the institute each year with over 70 applicants competing for every place. All subjects are taught in the English language. Strelka's educational program is one of the most successful and bold educational experiments worldwide thanks to a ground-breaking combination of the school, research center and public social venue. Its first curator was Rem Koolhaas, a Dutch architect and winner of the Pritzker Prize.

Strelka Press publishing house releases books on today's challenges of architecture and city development in the Russian and English languages.

Strelka runs an open air program which includes public lectures delivered by leading architects, designers and thinkers as well as conferences, workshops, concerts and festivals.

The Strelka institute though is a different beast, with the emphasis on producing students who can change the architectural landscape themselves.

Strelka's commercial program involves architectural competitions, such as the renovation of Gorky Park, Zaryadye and Polytechnic Museum, and develops urban solutions for Russian private and municipal customers.

The institute also runs Moscow's most popular and fashionable Bar Strelka.
Strelka has a vital importance for reviving interest in urban development and design and bringing the world's leading architects to Moscow to shape the new city's image.

VDNKh 
In summer 2014 Ilya Oskolkov-Tsentsiper headed project team affiliated with VDNKh direction which aims to redevelop the territory. Yuri Saprykine, former managing editor of Afisha-Rambler, has joined the team.

Business

Afisha Publishing House 
From 2007 to 2009, Oskolkov-Tsentsiper was general director at Afisha media holding company, which was part of Profmedia.

Yota 
From 2010 to 2012, he worked as Vice President of Russian mobile broadband operator Yota Group and was responsible for strategic communications, brand development, new services and Yota's office in London.

Winter 
In 2011, Oskolkov-Tsentsiper co-founded Winter, a design and communications consultancy based in London.  Winter specializes in offering branding, marketing and design services to Russian companies. In December 2012, Winter and The Apostol, a Russian center for strategic communications, developed a new brand image for state-owned corporation Rostekhnologii, rebranding it as Rostec.

Tsentsiper 
In 2014 Ilya Oskolkov-Tsentsiper founded self-named company with interdisciplinary team which has to do with service design, product design, urban design and planning, web development.
Today the company develops several complex projects for the Russian Post (with 41 901 subbranches and more than 350 000 employees), Sberbank (state-owned largest bank chain in Russia), PIK Group - the largest real estate and homebuilder company in Russia.

Sdelano 
'Sdelano' is a renovation service in-a-box. The service provides full apartment renovation for fixed price and in fixed dates. 'Sdelano" operates in Moscow and Moscow region.

Family 
Divorced, has a son Matvey. and daughter Mira.

References

1967 births
Journalists from Moscow
Russian designers
Living people
Russian magazine founders
Businesspeople from Moscow